Humbert J. Fugazy (January 28, 1885 – April 7, 1964) was a New York City boxing promoter around the 1930s. The Fugazy Bowl is named after him in his honour. He was also the owner of the Brooklyn Horsemen of the first American Football League in 1926. His father was Luigi Fugazy.

References

External links
Humbert J. Fugazy

1885 births
1964 deaths
American boxing promoters
American male boxers
Businesspeople from New York City
20th-century American businesspeople